Nam Đông is a rural district of Thừa Thiên Huế province in the North Central Coast region of Vietnam. As of 2003 the district had a population of 22,333. The district covers an area of 651 km². The district capital lies at Khe Tre.

Nam Dong is the southern gateway and key component in the economy of Thua Thien Hue Province. It is located in midland, highlands and bounded by Da Nang city and Quang Nam province in the south, Huong Thuy in the north, Phu Loc in the east and A Luoi prefecture in the west.

It has the least population of any district in Thua Thien Hue Province. There are 10,113 people of the ethnic minority (mainly Ka-tu people) and 13,295 ethnic Vietnamese and the female population is 11,493 (45.05%).

Its population density of 35.9 people/km² is the least in the province.

The population of working age is 11,589. Of these, 74.2% work in agricultural, forestry, and aquatic; 7.64% work in industry and construction; 9.13% work in service and trade; and 10.19% work as civil servants.

Nam Dong is the smallest prefecture of Thua Thien Hue Province.

The terrain is rugged with low hills and low mountains. The lifestyle is difficult with a poor economy and the lack of material necessities. Total production value in 2007 is 280.389 million VND. Agriculture, forestry and aquaculture comprise 107.638 million VND (38.32%), mainly by planting fruit-trees, industrial crops, food crops, breeding, foresting such as rubber plant and exploiting forest products. There are 664 households living below the poverty line (13.98%).

Nam Dong had universal compulsory education in to the completion of secondary school until 2006, and the education rates were higher than in neighbouring districts. The region is now connected with internet access.

References

Districts of Thừa Thiên Huế province